Rudy Alberto Williams (born 25 August 1965) is a retired Honduran football defender, who played most of his career for Olimpia in the Honduran Liga Nacional.

Club career
Williams also played for Vida, Pumas UNAH and Salvadoran club ADET. He is most famous for scoring the winning goal against Real España in the 1989–90 final that gave Olimpia its 10th national title.

International career
Williams made his senior debut for Honduras in a September 1992 friendly match against El Salvador and has earned a total of 12 caps, scoring 1 goal. He has represented his country in 1 FIFA World Cup qualification match and played at the 1995 UNCAF Nations Cup.

His final international was a December 1995 UNCAF Nations Cup match against Guatemala.

International goals
Scores and results list Honduras' goal tally first.

Retirement
After he quit playing, Williams lived in the United States for several years where he learned painting houses, a job he now has in Honduras.

Honours and awards

Club
C.D. Olimpia
Liga Profesional de Honduras (3): 1989–90, 1996–97, 1998–99
Honduran Cup: (2): 1995, 1998
Honduran Supercup: (1): 1997

C.D.S. Vida
Liga Profesional de Honduras (1): 1983–84

Country
Honduras
Copa Centroamericana (1): 1995

References

External links

1965 births
Living people
Association football defenders
Honduran footballers
Honduras international footballers
C.D.S. Vida players
C.D. Olimpia players
Honduran expatriate footballers
Expatriate footballers in El Salvador
Liga Nacional de Fútbol Profesional de Honduras players
Copa Centroamericana-winning players